Timothy Walters is a retired American soccer player.  He played professionally in the Western Soccer Alliance and Major Indoor Soccer League.

Player
Walters attended Indiana University where he played for the men's soccer team from 1976 to 1979.  In 1980, he turned professional with the Denver Avalanche of the Major Indoor Soccer League.  In 1982, he moved to the St. Louis Steamers where he played three seasons.  In 1985, he moved to the Wichita Wings.  On September 16, 1986, Walters signed with the Tampa Bay Rowdies for their single season in the American Indoor Soccer Association.  Walters finished his career with the St. Louis Ambush during the 1992–1993 National Professional Soccer League.

Coach
Walters coached the boys' and girls' soccer teams at Lafayette High School.  In 2008, he received the Jimmy Dunn Memorial High School Coach of the Year Award.  In addition to coaching high school soccer, Walters served as an assistant coach with the St. Louis Ambush for two seasons (1996–1998).  In September 2001, Walters became an assistant coach with the St. Louis Steamers.

References

External links
 MISL stats

Living people
1958 births
Soccer players from St. Louis
American Indoor Soccer Association players
American soccer players
Denver Avalanche players
Indiana Hoosiers men's soccer players
Major Indoor Soccer League (1978–1992) players
National Professional Soccer League (1984–2001) players
St. Louis Ambush (1992–2000) players
St. Louis Steamers (original MISL) players
Tampa Bay Rowdies (1975–1993) players
Wichita Wings (MISL) players
Association football forwards